Kurkinsky (masculine), Kurkinskaya (feminine), or Kurkinskoye (neuter) may refer to:
Kurkinsky District, a district of Tula Oblast, Russia
Kurkinskaya, a rural locality (a village) in Vologda Oblast, Russia